Héctor Omar Ramos Lebrón (born 4 May 1990), also known as Pito Ramos or simply Pito, is a Puerto Rican footballer, who plays as a forward for Metropolitan FA and the Puerto Rico national team.

Career
Ramos began 2011 playing for Puerto Rico United and joined Puerto Rico Islanders in September 2011 on loan from Criollos de Caguas. He signed with Islanders for the 2012 season on 20 January 2012. On 5 July 2013, it was confirmed that Ramos would be the third foreign player for Salvadoran club, Isidro Metapán.

Ramos joined the newly formed Puerto Rico FC ahead of their Fall 2016 season. He scored the first goal in club history on his debut against the Indy Eleven, earning the team a draw. He was released at the end of the 2017 season.

In 2018 and 2020 Ramos played for Malaysian team, Sabah FA.

International goals
Scores and results list Puerto Rico's goal tally first.

References

External links
NASL profile

Profile at theplayersagent.com 
A.D. Isidro Metapán Profile

1990 births
Living people
People from Maunabo, Puerto Rico
Association football forwards
Puerto Rican footballers
Puerto Rico international footballers
Sevilla FC Puerto Rico players
Puerto Rico United players
Puerto Rico Islanders players
Al-Qadsiah FC players
USL Championship players
North American Soccer League players
Nejapa footballers
Expatriate footballers in El Salvador
A.D. Isidro Metapán footballers
Puerto Rico FC players
Saudi Professional League players
Sabah F.C. (Malaysia) players
Puerto Rico youth international footballers
Puerto Rican expatriate footballers
Expatriate footballers in Saudi Arabia
Expatriate footballers in Malaysia